Anna Maria Orso (December 11, 1938 – August 14, 2012) was an Italian film actress whose career in international and Italian cinema spanned more than fifty years.

Career 
Orso made her film debut in The Bible: In the Beginning, a 1966 religious epic film directed by American film director John Huston. Over the course of her career, Orso appeared in numerous American and Italian films directed by Alberto Bevilacqua, Marco Bellocchio, Jose Dajane, Riccardo Donna, Diego Febbraro, Luciano Odorisio, Pasquale Squitieri, Massimo Troisi, and Wim Wenders.

Orso appeared in the 2003 HBO television series, Angels in America, opposite Al Pacino and Meryl Streep. She was also cast in the 2004 film, The Life Aquatic with Steve Zissou, directed by Wes Anderson. At the time of her death in 2012, Orso was filming The Girl from Nagasaki, a film adaptation of Madame Butterfly, directed by Michel Comte.

Anna Orso died in a Rome hospital of an illness on August 14, 2012, at the age of 74. She was survived by her son, Umberto. Her remains were cremated, and a memorial service was scheduled for the library of cinema in Trastevere in September 2012.

Partial filmography

Storie sulla sabbia (1963)
I patriarchi (1964) - Eve
The Bible: In the Beginning... (1966) - Shem's Wife
Gentleman Killer (1967) - Ruth Morrison
Day of Anger (1967) - Eileen Cutcher
Quarta parete (1968)
Agguato sul Bosforo (1969) - Roberta (uncredited)
Lettera aperta a un giornale della sera (1969)
Io e Dio (1970)
Questa specie d'amore (1972)
I Kiss the Hand (1973) - Signora Ardizzone
The Inheritor (1973) - Giovanella Cordell
24 ore... non un minuto di più (1974)
Young Lucrezia (1974)
La profanazione (1974) - Giovanna Cattanei - aka Vannozza
Cagliostro (1975) - The Queen
 (1975) - Marcella
Ride bene... chi ride ultimo (1977) - Wife of Entrepreneur (segment "Arriva lo Sceicco")
Il ladrone (1980) - Maria Magdalena
Salto nel vuoto (1980) - Marilena
L'ultima volta insieme (1981) - Vittoria
Exterminators of the Year 3000 (1983) - Linda
Il pentito (1985)
Il mostro di Firenze (1986) - Mother of a victim
Devil in the Flesh (1986) - Mrs. Dozza
La vita di scorta (1986)
Le vie del Signore sono finite (1987)
Al calar della sera (1992)
Adelaide (1992)
Blu notte (1992)
Cominciò tutto per caso (1993) - Madre di Stefania
Io e il re (1995)
Un giorno, un giorno, una notte... (1997) - La donna da anziana
Ponte Milvio (2000) - Emilia
Incontri di primavera (2000)
The Life Aquatic with Steve Zissou (2004) - Party Guest #2
Manuale d'amore (2005) - Margherita's mother
L'anno mille (2008) - Guaritrice
Palermo Shooting (2008) - Mother
Four Single Fathers (2009) - Dom's Mother
My Way (2012) - La vieille Italienne
Breve storia di lunghi tradimenti (2012) - Signora con i capelli bianchi
The Girl from Nagasaki (2013)
Darkside Witches (2015) - Witch (final film role)

References

External links

2012 deaths
Italian film actresses
1938 births
Italian television actresses
Actresses from Naples
20th-century Italian actresses
21st-century Italian actresses